Payton may refer to:

Payton (given name)
Payton (surname)
85386 Payton, main-belt minor planet

See also
Peyton (disambiguation)